Miss Show Business is a studio album by Judy Garland, released in 1955 on Capitol Records. The album peaked at #5 on the Billboard 200. It was arranged by Hal Mooney and Roger Edens. Jack Cathcart was the conductor. Sanford Roth was responsible for the cover photography.

Track listing

References

1955 albums
Judy Garland albums
albums arranged by Hal Mooney
Capitol Records albums